Hannes Þór Halldórsson (born 27 April 1984) is an Icelandic filmmaker and former professional footballer. He was a member of the Iceland national team where he was capped 77 times and appeared at UEFA Euro 2016 and the 2018 FIFA World Cup.

Club career

Iceland 
Hannes played club football in Iceland for Leiknir, Afturelding, Stjarnan, Fram and KR.

Hannes joined KR at the age of 5. He quit football at the age of 20 following a shoulder injury, before returning to the sport and joining third-tier Leiknir. Hannes started his career at Leiknir at a time when the team was in the fourth- and third tier of the Icelandic football league system. Hannes was let go from Leiknir in 2004 after making a number of serious mistakes in an important game that revolved around progressing to the second tier.

During his time at Leiknir, Hannes sought to join Númi, which played in the Icelandic bottom tier, after struggling to get into the Leiknir first team, but the team rejected him. After leaving Leiknir, Hannes joined Afturelding, which played in the third tier.

Early in his career, Hannes struggled with shoulder injuries. Hannes was known for poor kicking during his early career.

In 2006, Hannes joined Stjarnan, which played in the second tier.

He joined Fram, a first tier team, in 2007.

Hannes said that at the time (in early 2005), he set a goal of becoming a goalkeeper for a team in the first tier in three years' time, and hoped to play abroad after that.

He joined KR in 2011, winning the double with the team in his first season.

Out of Iceland 
On 28 March 2012, Hannes joined Norwegian club SK Brann on a short-term loan, as a cover for injured goalkeeper Piotr Leciejewski.

In December 2013, Hannes joined Norwegian club Sandnes Ulf, having trained with the club in October 2013 as preparation for Iceland's World Cup playoff game against Croatia. He became a professional footballer in 2014.

On 6 July 2015, Dutch Eredivisie club NEC announced they had signed Hannes on a two-year contract.

On 15 July 2016, Danish club Randers FC signed Hannes on a three-year contract.

On 3 July 2018, Hannes signed a two-year contract with Qarabağ FK.  On 5 April 2019, he left Qarabağ by mutual consent. Hannes had at that point become the third-choice goalkeeper at Qarabag.

Return to Iceland 
On 9 April 2019, Icelandic club Valur signed Hannes on a four-year contract. Hannes cited family reasons and the four-year contract as reasons to return to the Icelandic top flight division. He left Valur on 11 November 2021.

On 16 March 2022, Hannes announced his retirement from football.

In June 2022, Hannes agreed to join Víkingur Reykjavík as backup goalkeeper following the injuries of Víkingur goalkeepers Ingvar Jónsson and Uggi Auðunsson.

International career

Hannes made his international debut for Iceland in 2011, keeping a clean sheet in a Euro 2012 qualifier against Cyprus.

At that time, Hannes was considered the main goalkeeper of the national team, after appearing in all twelve 2014 World Cup qualifiers for Iceland.

Hannes was selected for Euro 2016 in Iceland's first ever appearance in a major tournament. He made his first UEFA European Championship appearance in matchday 1 of Group F versus Portugal which ended in a 1–1 draw. Iceland eventually reached the knockout phase after finishing runner-up behind Hungary. Played on China Cup 2017, where Iceland won silver medals

In May 2018, he was named in Iceland's 23-man squad for the 2018 World Cup in Russia. On 16 June 2018, Hannes saved a penalty kick from Argentina's Lionel Messi in Iceland's first World Cup match, which ended in a 1–1 draw and Hannes being named man of the match.

On 8 September 2021, Hannes announced his retirement from the national team after his 77th match.

Personal life
Hannes has worked as a film director when not playing football. He directed, amongst other things, Iceland's video for their entry to the 2012 Eurovision Song Contest. His employer before leaving to Norway to become a fully professional footballer, Sagafilm, has promised him his job back when he returns to Iceland after his expatriate footballing career.

Hannes directed a 2018 World Cup advertisement for Coca-Cola, and his directional film debut Cop Secret. In 2022, he directed an UEFA Women's Euro 2022 advertisement for N1, featuring Glódís Perla Viggósdóttir.

Career statistics

International

References

External links

1984 births
Living people
Hannes Thor Halldorsson
Hannes Thor Halldorsson
Hannes Thor Halldorsson
Association football goalkeepers
Hannes Thor Halldorsson
Hannes Thor Halldorsson
Hannes Thor Halldorsson
Hannes Thor Halldorsson
SK Brann players
NEC Nijmegen players
FK Bodø/Glimt players
Sandnes Ulf players
Eliteserien players
Eredivisie players
Hannes Thor Halldorsson
Hannes Thor Halldorsson
Expatriate men's footballers in Denmark
Expatriate footballers in Norway
Expatriate footballers in the Netherlands
Hannes Thor Halldorsson
Hannes Thor Halldorsson
Hannes Thor Halldorsson
Hannes Thor Halldorsson
Randers FC players
Danish Superliga players
Qarabağ FK players
Expatriate footballers in Azerbaijan
UEFA Euro 2016 players
2018 FIFA World Cup players
Hannes Thor Halldorsson
Hannes Thor Halldorsson
Knattspyrnufélagið Víkingur players